The 2021–22 Gamma Ethniki was the 39th season since the official establishment of the championship in 1983, and the first after the reestablishment as the 3rd tier of the Greek Football.
It started on 23 October 2021. After the finish of the seven groups, the champion of each group qualified for a playoff round, to determine which four teams will be promoted to 2022–23 Super League 2.

81 teams are divided into seven groups according to geographical criteria.

Group 1

Teams

Standings

Group 2

Teams

Standings

Group 3

Teams

Standings

Group 4

Teams

Standings

Group 5

Teams

Standings

Group 6

Teams

Standings

Group 7

Teams

Standings

Play-off round 

The seven champions from Regular season met once (6 matches per team) for four places in 2022–23 Super League Greece 2. It started on 15 May 2022.

References

Third level Greek football league seasons
3
Greece